Dan Wofford is an American lawyer and politician. Running for United States Congress as a Democrat in 2002, Wofford lost a close race in Pennsylvania's 6th US House District to Jim Gerlach in 2002.

Wofford is the son of the late United States Senator Harris Wofford (D-PA).  He worked in the Pennsylvania governor's office and later directed Philadelphia's College Access Program, which helps low-income Philadelphia students prepare for college.

The 6th US House district in Pennsylvania is a district that was gerrymandered by a Republican-led House in order to elect a greater number of Republicans, including State Senator Gerlach. The district was more competitive in 2002 than voter registration numbers suggested, and the election was close:  Wofford lost by only 51% to 49%.

In 2008, Wofford was a delegate from Pennsylvania to the Democratic National Convention. He voted for Democratic nominee Barack Obama.

Wofford earned a bachelor's degree in history from Yale University in 1977 and a J.D. degree from Georgetown University in 1983. As a student at Harriton High School of Lower Merion in Rosemont, Pennsylvania, Wofford  was the captain of the soccer team and an All-Pennsylvania lacrosse player.

Wofford's 2002 campaign website was given "The Candidate Vanity Award" by the political website PoliticsPA for its large photo of Wofford.

References 

 CNN.com Election 2002 - State Races: Pennsylvania.  Accessed December 30, 2005.
 Dan Wofford For Congress.  Archived copy from December 3, 2002.  Accessed December 30, 2005.
 Eichel, Larry.  GOP Redistricting Gamble Looks Safe.  Philadelphia Inquirer.  October 16, 2002.  Accessed December 30, 2005.

Living people
Pennsylvania Democrats
Year of birth missing (living people)
Yale College alumni
Georgetown University Law Center alumni
Harriton High School alumni